Yoon Jong-tae (born 12 February 1998) is a Zainichi Korean football midfielder of South Korean nationality, who plays for Daegu FC in the K League 1.

Club career
Born in Kobe, Japan on 12 February 1998 as a third-generation Zainichi Korean, Yoon was educated at Kansai University's attached Hokuyo High School and played his youth football for International Pacific University, where he was known as Shota Ito. A midfielder, he joined Daegu FC in July 2019. He made his debut for the club on 26 July 2020, coming on as a late match substitute in a K League 1 match against Busan IPark.

Club career statistics

Notes

1998 births
Living people
Association football midfielders
South Korean footballers
Daegu FC players
K League 1 players
Zainichi Korean people